William Cahill (1923 - 18th August 2001) was an Irish hurler who played for Kilkenny Championship clubs Graigue–Ballycallan and Slieverue. He was also a member of the Kilkenny senior hurling team and was full-forward on the 1947 All-Ireland Championship-winning team.

Honours

Player

Callan CBS
Leinster Colleges Senior Hurling Championship (1): 1941

University College Cork
Fitzgibbon Cup (1): 1947

Graigue–Ballycallan
Kilkenny Senior Hurling Championship (1): 1949
Kilkenny Junior Hurling Championship (1): 1946

Slieverue
Kilkenny Senior Hurling Championship (1): 1954

Kilkenny
All-Ireland Senior Hurling Championship (1): 1947
Leinster Senior Hurling Championship (1): 1947
All-Ireland Junior Hurling Championship (1): 1946
Leinster Junior Hurling Championship (1): 1946

Trainer

Slieverue
Kilkenny Senior Hurling Championship (1): 1954

References

1923 births
2001 deaths
Graigue-Ballycallan hurlers
Slieverue hurlers
UCC hurlers
Kilkenny inter-county hurlers
Leinster inter-provincial hurlers
All-Ireland Senior Hurling Championship winners